The Orthalicoidea are a superfamily of air-breathing land snails, terrestrial gastropod mollusks in the infraorder Orthalicoidei  of the suborder Helicina

Distribution 
The Orthalicoidea is a dominant faunal element in the Neotropics, but also has a number of genera with a Gondwanan distribution.

Taxonomy

2005 taxonomy 
This taxonomy, as accepted by Bouchet & Rocroi, was based on the study by Nordsieck, published in 1986, and the classification as formulated by Schileyko in 1999. However Bouchet & Rocroi diverged from this classification in uniting the families Bulimulidae and Orthalacidae. They also considered the family Placostylidae as a distinct family from Orthalicidae, and the family Coelociontidae a distinct family from Urocoptidae. However, the position of the families Megaspiridae and Grangerellidae is doubtful.

The following seven families have been recognized in the taxonomy of Bouchet & Rocroi (2005):

Family Cerionidae Pilsbry, 1901
Family Coelociontidae Iredale, 1937
 † Family Grangerellidae Russell, 1931
Family Megaspiridae Pilsbry, 1904
Family Orthalicidae Albers, 1860
Family Placostylidae Pilsbry, 1946
Family Urocoptidae Pilsbry, 1898 (1868)
 Vidaliellidae H. Nordsieck, 1986 †

2008 taxonomy 
Uit de Weerd moved two families Urocoptidae and Cerionidae to newly established superfamily Urocoptoidea based on molecular phylogeny research in 2008.

2009 taxonomy 
Family Prestonellidae van Bruggen, 1978 - A study by Herbert and Mitchell, published in 2009, places this enigmatic family, of which the phylogenetic relationships were previously unknown, in the Gondwanan superfamily Orthalicoidea, while it was previously tentatively placed as a synonym of Aillyidae.

2010 taxonomy 
Breure et al. (2010) moved Prestonella and Bothriembryon to Placostylidae and they elevated Bulimulinae to Bulimulidae, Odontostomini to Odontostomidae, Amphibuliminae to Amphibulimidae. They also removed Coelociontidae from Orthalicoidea.

2012 taxonomy 
Breure & Romero (2012) confirmed previous results from 2010, additionally they elevated Simpulopsini to Simpulopsidae, renamed Placostylidae to Bothriembryontidae. Therefore, there are recognized seven extant families and one extinct family within Orthalicoidea:
 Amphibulimidae P. Fischer, 1873
 Bothriembryontidae Iredale, 1937
 Bulimulidae Tryon, 1867
 † Grangerellidae Russell, 1931
 Megaspiridae Pilsbry, 1904
 Odontostomidae Pilsbry & Vanatta, 1898
 Orthalicidae Albers, 1860
 Simpulopsidae Schileyko, 1999
 † Vidaliellidae H. Nordsieck, 1986

References
This article incorporates CC-BY-3.0 text from the reference

Further reading 
 Borrero F. J. & Breure A. S. H. (Submitted). "The Orthalicoidea (Mollusca: Gastropoda: Stylommatophora) from Colombia and adjacent areas: a review of taxonomy and biogeography. 1. Dryptus Albers, 1860 and Plekocheilus Guilding, 1828".

Stylommatophora
Gastropod superfamilies